Anna O. Linzer is an American novelist, and non-profit management consultant.

Life
Anna Linzer lived on the Suquamish Indian Reservation in Indianola, Washington.

Anna lives in Indianola with her husband Richard, and leads retreats and sessions on nonprofit financial management.

Awards
 1999 American Book Award
 2001 Terry MacAdam Award

Works

 A RIVER STORY    2010.

References

External links
 Mike Dillon, August 2010 http://citylivingseattle.com/main.asp?sectionid=1&subsectionid=88&pageID=4

20th-century American novelists
21st-century American novelists
American women novelists
Living people
20th-century American women writers
21st-century American women writers
American Book Award winners
Year of birth missing (living people)